A 16 ft Skiff is a class of three-person sailing dinghy with twin trapezes and a large asymmetrical spinnaker. The class is unique to Australia, where it is one of the most popular boats sailing with 95 boats registered in 12 clubs. The class has the largest fleet of high performance skiffs on the east coast of Australia. Due to the nature of only allowing two trapezes, the age of the sailors can vary between 15 and 60 years old, making it a versatile class of boat.

Construction 
The hull, spars and foils are all constructed out of a carbon composite reinforced polymer. Manufacturers of these hulls are generally local boat builders, however are now being sourced overseas. The total weight of the boat is no more than 85 kg fully rigged, resulting in an extremely high sail area to weight ratio.

History
The class has been around for over a century and has changed significantly since its beginnings:
1901
Class founded in Balmain

1908
Class expands to Queensland

1922
Class spreads to Western Australia

1976
Rules change to allow any material for hull

1986
Three man crew introduced

1997–98
Stick class rules were introduced

Class specifications

Overall length—
Construction—Carbon Fibre Reinforced Polymer (CFRP)
Min beam—
Max beam—
Min weight—
Working sail area—
Spinnaker sail area—
Racing crew—Three

External links
 Skiffs.org.au

References

Dinghies